Namibia follows a largely independent foreign policy, with strong affiliations with states that aided the independence struggle, including Libya and Cuba.

In Africa, Namibia has been involved in conflicts in neighbouring Angola as well as Democratic Republic of the Congo.

International organizations

Namibia is a member of 47 international organizations. These are:

United Nations

Namibia became the 160th member of the United Nations on 23 April 1990 upon independence.

African Union

With a small army and a fragile economy, the Namibian Government's principal foreign policy concern is developing strengthened ties within the Southern African region. A dynamic member of the Southern African Development Community, Namibia is a vocal advocate for greater regional integration.

International disputes

Namibia is involved in several minor international disputes.
 Commission established with Botswana to resolve small residual disputes along the Caprivi Strip, including the Situngu marshlands along the Linyanti River
 Botswana residents protest Namibia's planned construction of the Okavango hydroelectric dam on Popa Falls
 Managed dispute with South Africa over the location of the boundary in the Orange River
 Dormant dispute remains where Botswana, Namibia, Zambia, and Zimbabwe boundaries converge
 Angolan rebels and refugees still reside in Namibia

Bilateral relations

Africa

Americas

Asia

Europe

Oceania

Namibia and the Commonwealth of Nations

Namibia has been a Commonwealth republic since 1990, when South West Africa became independent of South Africa.

See also 

 List of diplomatic missions in Namibia
 List of diplomatic missions of Namibia

Notes and references

 

 
Namibia and the Commonwealth of Nations